Cantharus petwayae is a species of sea snail, a marine gastropod mollusk in the family Pisaniidae.

Original description
  Poppe G.T., Tagaro S.P. & Goto Y. (2018). New marine species from the Central Philippines. Visaya. 5(1): 91-135. page(s): 101, pl. 7 figs 1-3.

References

Pisaniidae
Gastropods described in 2018